The nightingale reed warbler (Acrocephalus luscinius), or  Guam reed-warbler, was a songbird endemic to Guam. It has not been seen since 1969.

Taxonomy and systematics 
The nightingale reed warbler was described by the French zoologists 
Jean Quoy and Joseph Gaimard in 1832 from a specimen collected on the island of Guam in the western Pacific Ocean. They coined the binomial name, Thryothorus luscinius. Until 2011, the Pagan reed warbler, Aguiguan reed warbler, and Saipan reed warbler were considered as subspecies of the nightingale reed warbler until split by the IOC.

Threats 
The nightingale reed warbler was driven to extinction by several introduced species. These included the brown tree snake which has also decimated the populations of several other bird species on Guam. Other introduced predators included rats, cats and feral ungulates such as goats or sheep. An introduced plant, ivy gourd, destroyed the canopy of the trees that nightingale reed warblers built their nests in. Wetland destruction, fires and pesticides, as well as intensive land use for agriculture or building further reduced the available habitat.

Nesting 
The nightingale reed warbler is nonmigratory and nests year round. The typical clutch has two eggs that are white with a green tint and are covered in lavender, chestnut, and black spots.

Notes

References

Acrocephalus (bird)
Birds described in 1832
ESA endangered species